Vincent S. Brand III (born July 6, 1963) is an American stand-up comedian from Middletown, NJ. He is best known for being the owner of The Stress Factory Comedy Clubs located in New Brunswick, NJ and Bridgeport, CT. Brand has also made television and radio appearances on shows, such as Tough Crowd with Colin Quinn, Last Comic Standing, The Rosie O'Donnell Show, The Opie and Anthony Show, NickMom, Night Out, and Restaurant Stakeout.

Biography 
Vinnie Brand was born and raised in Middletown, NJ. Brand attended Rutgers University, but did not graduate. After that, he opened up a flower shop and construction company. When both companies failed, Brand eventually found success in business when he opened Stress Factory Comedy Club in 1991. Throughout its business years, Stress Factory has featured comic headliners such as Drew Carey, Gilbert Gottfried, Bobo Kerlin, Chris Rock, and Andrew Dice Clay.

Brand has also performed at other comedy venues outside of his own club, including Comic Strip Live and Helium Comedy Club.

Along with the success of his comedy club, Brand has made various of television appearances including Tough Crowd with Colin Quinn, Last Comic Standing, Dave Attell: Road Work, Restaurant Stakeout, and NickMom Night Out.

He was a frequent radio guest on The Opie and Anthony Show. His daughter Danielle was in a relationship with co-host Anthony Cumia until 2015.

Prior to folding in 2015, NickMom was in development for a "docu-comedy" starring Brand and his family, and had Jim Breuer credited as an executive producer for the project.

References

External links 
 

Living people
American male comedians
21st-century American comedians
People from Middletown Township, New Jersey
Rutgers University alumni
Year of birth missing (living people)